Hollywood Hijinx is an interactive fiction video game written by Dave Anderson and Liz Cyr-Jones and published by Infocom in 1986. The game was released for the  Apple II, Atari 8-bit family, Atari ST, Amstrad CPC, Amstrad PCW, Commodore 64, Amiga, TI-99/4A, and DOS. It was Infocom's twenty-third game.

Plot
As the favorite among all of actor-director Buddy Burbank and Hildegarde Montague's nephews and nieces, the player's character stands to inherit the entirety of the Burbank estate, including their palatial home Hildebud, if the player can find the ten treasures (props from Buddy's films) that crafty Aunt Hildegarde has hidden on the grounds, that is. It all has to be done in the space of one night.

Hildebud is filled with props, posters, and other memorabilia from Buddy's numerous films: a model of Tokyo with Atomic Chihuahua, the Maltese Finch, and a statue of "Buck Palace, the Fighting Mailman" (star of such films as Postage Due and Special Delivery). There are hidden passages, a convoluted hedge maze, and other bizarre features of the estate. Strange noises sound like someone else is in the house.

Feelies 
Physical items included in the game's packaging were:
A copy of Tinsel World, a fictional Hollywood tabloid
A swizzle stick in the shape of a palm tree
An autographed picture of Uncle Buddy with inscription on the back
Aunt Hildegarde's will

References

External links
 
 Scans of Hollywood Hijinx package, documentation and feelies
 Infocom-if.org's entry for Hollywood Hijinx
 

1980s interactive fiction
1986 video games
Adventure games
Amiga games
Amstrad CPC games
Amstrad PCW games
Apple II games
Atari 8-bit family games
Atari ST games
Classic Mac OS games
Commodore 64 games
DOS games
Infocom games
TI-99/4A games
TRS-80 games
Video games developed in the United States
Single-player video games